Cyphogastra semipurpurea is a Jewel Beetle of the Buprestidae family.

Subspecies
 Cyphogastra semipurpurea rollei Théry, 1908 
 Cyphogastra semipurpurea romanensis Théry, 1926 
 Cyphogastra semipurpurea rothschildi Kerremans, 1911 
 Cyphogastra semipurpurea semipurpurea (Laporte & Gory, 1835) 
 Cyphogastra semipurpurea wetteriana Théry, 1935

Description
The basic colour of the elytra is metallic dark purplish, while the thorax is yellowish.

Distribution
This species occurs in Indonesia and North Papua New Guinea.

References

External links
 Flickr

Buprestidae
semipurpurea
Beetles described in 1835